HD 30080, also known as HR 1509, is a solitary, orange hued star located in the southern constellation Caelum, the chisel. It has an apparent magnitude of 5.66, allowing it to be faintly visible to the naked eye. Parallax measurements from Gaia DR3 place the object at a distance of 612 light years. Eggen (1989) lists it as a member of the thick disk population.

HD 30080 is an evolved red giant with a stellar classification of K3 III. It is currently on the red giant branch, generating energy by fusing a hydrogen shell around an inert helium core. It has 116% the mass of the Sun but has expanded to 41.6 times its girth.

References 

Caelum
K-type giants
30080
1509
CD-30 01968
021958
170882932
Caeli, 12